St. Paul's Church, also known as St. Paul's Lutheran Church and Day School and St. Peter's Lutheran, is a historic Lutheran church located at New Melle, St. Charles County, Missouri.  It was built in 1860 by A. Carl Schlottmann and is a one-story rectangular limestone rubble block building on a limestone rubble foundation. It features a projecting bell tower added in 1881. St. Paul's Lutheran Church was founded by German immigrants in 1844 and was the first Lutheran Church in St. Charles County.

The property was listed on the National Register of Historic Places in 1982.

References

External links
 History of St. Paul's

Churches on the National Register of Historic Places in Missouri
Churches completed in 1860
German-American culture in Missouri
1844 establishments in Missouri
19th-century Lutheran churches in the United States
Buildings and structures in St. Charles County, Missouri
Lutheran churches in Missouri
National Register of Historic Places in St. Charles County, Missouri